Sucker Creek 150A is an Indian reserve of the Sucker Creek First Nation in Alberta, located within Big Lakes County. It is 22 kilometres south of High Prairie. In the 2016 Canadian Census, it recorded a population of 689 living in 235 of its 274 total private dwellings.

References

Indian reserves in Alberta